The Kriva Palanka dialect (Krivopalanečki dijalekt) is a member of the eastern subgroup of the northern group of dialects of Macedonian. This dialect is mainly spoken in the city of Kriva Palanka and surrounding villages.

Phonological characteristics
use of A instead of E: трева / treva > трава / trava;
use of the letter U instead of the letter A: рака  / raka > рука / ruka (hand), пат  / pat > пут / put (road);

Morphological characteristics
imperfective verbs are typically derived from perfective verbs by means of the suffix –ue (e.g. зборуе and текнуе)
use of the preposition U (in).

Personal pronouns
Singular:
Ја / ја (I)
Ти / ti (you)
Он / on (he)
Она / ona (she)
Оно / ono (it)

References

Dialects of the Macedonian language
Kriva Palanka Municipality
Kriva Palanka